In mathematics, Jensen's theorem may refer to:
Johan Jensen's inequality for convex functions
Johan Jensen's formula in complex analysis
Ronald Jensen's covering theorem in set theory